This is a list of characters from Japanese visual novel and manga Twinkle Crusaders. The main protagonist is Shin Sakura, the student council president of Ryuusei Academy. The other members of the student council are his childhood friend, Nanaka Yugiri, the treasurer of the group who has an affection for sweets; Misa Brigitta Cristelis, the vice-president and a competitive tsundere towards Shin; Lolotte Rozenkreuz, the secretary and also an angel which she often denies so; and, lastly, Ria Kujouh who acts as their adviser and a former president. Azel, the last heroine of the series, appeared as an transferred student in Shin's class.

Two additional characters were introduced as heroines in  Twinkle Crusaders GoGo!, the PlayStation Portable version of the game. The first is Melilot, a supporting character in the original visual novel, who is a friend of Ria's older sister, Harena. The second is Macaroon, who is a demon in training.

Student Council

Voiced by: Mitsuki Saiga
Main protagonist of the series. He comes from a poor family but became the student council president of Ryuusei Academy through sheer dumb luck, out of a sole desire for free food (which ended up not coming true). As it turns out, one of the jobs of the council is to fight off demons, or Mazoku. This is particularly troublesome for Shin, since his father is the previous maou (demon lord), and he himself is to be his successor. He later goes on to take on his role, but still continues to fight for good.

In battle Shin uses the dark element, and has two forms. His first form is prior to his ascendance to maou, and his title is Vicious Lancer. In this form, he has average stats all-around except "Potential," which is maxed out. This leads into his second form as maou, titled Ancient Overlord, where he receives a boost in power, attack speed, and charge speed, as well as changing his hair color white.

Voiced by: Keito Mizukiri
One of the five heroines, she is Synn's lively childhood friend. Nanaka has a crush on Shin and has been following him around since she was young, enrolling in the same school and joining the student council, where she is the accountant. She likes sweet confectioneries and is the president of the sweets club at school. She holds a grudge against the president of the wagashi (Japanese Sweets) Club Akane Misasagi(御陵彩錦). While the sweets club receives no budget from the school and not even recognized as a proper club, Misasagi's wagashi club have "wagashi for thought" and was recognized as a club (though only in name). Her title is Sword Master).

In battle, Nanaka has fire-based attacks, and is the powerhouse of the original group. In her first form, her power is on par with Shin's upgraded form, but her own upgraded form increases her power to go even further beyond that. Her speed and charge are average, with her support being below average in her first form, and average in her second. She's not the best in unisons, but in exchange, she can deal substantial damage even if she attacks solo. She's also the main protagonist of the anime series.

Voiced by: Motomi Nanaho
A first-year student and the student council's secretary. Despite her attempts to hide the fact that she's actually an angel, it is generally known to the other characters, unbeknownst to her. Despite her looks and her voice, she's a real foul-mouth, though without any malicious intent. She is always carrying "Tontoro," a piggy bank filled with 500 yen, and always breaking it. She also carries a guidebook around that seems to have everything in context (although the usages are often wrong). Her family, the Rosenkreuz family, includes some of Ryuusei City’s multimillionaires. She commutes by car, and her butler Riesling never leaves her side outside the school ground. Her title is Elemental Muse.

In battle she uses water element and her power is not strong; her speed is unpredictable as well with a decent charge, making her support in some battles.

Voiced by: Kayo Sakata
Twinkle Crusaderss third heroine and the student council's vice-president. Misa thinks of Shin as a rival, and always challenges him despite always ending up in second, falling behind Shin. She is especially annoyed about losing the election, which Shin won by chance. She has her cousin Shion Asuka i(飛鳥井紫苑) (who actually calls her "姉上(Big Sister)") as her assistant in some battles.

Voiced by: Yuki Sakata
The fourth heroine in Twinkle Crusaders, Ria, is a clumsy and soft-spoken third year student. Ria serves as an adviser to the student council due to her past experience as the student council president. She enjoys wagashi and participates in the wagashi club at school. She's also the younger sister of the current chief director Helena (ヘレナ) who was in the current student council's shoes when she was a student. Helana assists Ria is some battles.

Ryuusei Academy students

Voiced by: Rumi Abe 
Azel is the final heroine in Twinkle Crusaders, a second-year student who transferred into Shin's class in the middle of the story. Azel is very quiet and has a cold attitude towards others. She does not participate in any school activities, and like Shin, comes from a poor family.

Voiced by: Akiko Hasegawa
Misa's cousin, she is the shrine maiden of the Asukai Shrine and she assists Misa during battles. Like the twinkle crusaders, she too hunts demons due to her role, but she is somewhat reckless while hunting and destroys part of the street while Synn and Misa are passing by.

Voiced by: Asami Shimoda
Close friend of Nanaka. Nickname “Sacchin”. A very positive personality -- just talking with her will make one feel lazy -- but surprisingly, she has a dark side. She is one of the few members of Sweets Association but often pisses Nanaka off since she likes anything sweet in general, including Japanese treats. Has poor academic grades, but has insights on life. She has a sharp sense on relationships -- when Synn chose other people she will comfort Nanaka.

A classmate of Ria and President of the Wagashi club.

Others

Voiced by: Kana Asumi
She is a demon-in-training, who calls Synn her Onii-chan. Like Synn, she uses the dark element. She is always carrying a great sword called Al-Zard, given by the previous Demon King, if she let go she will regress into baby stage (she will overcome it later in her route).
She can’t stand coldness, so she always wears a homemade pink coat. She is also unable to eat hot food (nekoshita) and is very weak at electronics. Her title is Imperial Valkyrie.

Her stats are comparable to Azel's, being above-average in all fields except support, which is her strongest stat.

One of the first enemies you meet in the first game. She's a pretty weak devil, though, as her title Petite Devil implies, and joins pretty easily after a few losses, since she's more than content with just lazing around and eating snacks as opposed to causing trouble. She's typically seen with the giant cow, Oderooku. Seri-chan also becomes Nanaka's assist, while both her and Oderooku can participate in both Fatality Force or Arcane Meteor Stream.

Lolotte's butler. She appears out of nowhere whether Lolotte needs her or not. She refers to herself in the third person and often scares people who want to tease Lolotte. As so, she is Lolotte's assist during battle and uses dual pistols that can push back an enemy by a few frames.

Pakki
Voiced by: Mai Goto
He proclaimed himself to be the Wise One, A present from Synn’s father to him. A familiar that takes on the appearance of a 20 cm high stuffed panda. No trace of the "Wise One" can be found on this creature. He always exaggerates whatever Synn is talking about into a great and evil plan. Loves girls with big breasts (especially Ria) and couldn’t care less about the other members in the Student Council. Calling Nanaka as “Soba”, Misa as “Hiss”, Lolotte as “Angel”, Sari as “no breast (pettanko)”, Macaroon as “Shorty” and “black stocking”, “Aze kou” and many other nicknames, and Synn as “Demon King (Maou-sama)." There seems to be some sort of reason behind these naming, but unless it’s a nasty name (he calls Shio by "monster") he doesn’t seems to care much though. Depending on the scenario he will become an enemy once (only in Ria's route). He gives Synn advice on life from time to time. Although he serves the previous Demon King (Synn’s father), he didn’t know about Synn’s existence until now.

He is Shin's primary assist in the game. Like Shin he has a dark attribute.
Amyrina
Voiced by: Asami Imai
A mysterious girl who appears in the middle portion of the story and wanders around in the streets. Lolotte's childhood and best friend. She is also an angel. She became a heroine in Fandisc.
Fuyuka Anenokouji
A cameo character from Patissier na Nyanko, apparently she works as a waitress in a cafe.

7th General

Voiced by: Kimiko Koyama
A friend of Herena, her title is Living Lexicon -7th General-, and she appears to be a maid. She takes everything seriously, making her stubborn and mysterious. Helena often fools around with her due to her stubborn personality.

Despite her looks, she is one of the strongest opponents in the game, second only to Bylous and Zortia. Her element usage is dark and one of the tricky skills is her Shadow Reactor/(EX Unison) which is a broken attack that gathers her other non-unison party members, and places them in a unison after her turn. Used correctly, this could be devastating for the opponent. This is also Meilot's assist attack.

Bylous
The strongest of all general. Like Synnn he has two forms. His first form is Mortal Duelist -7th General-. Even in this form, he has impressive strength and high attack/charge speed. His support is nonexistent, but given that he generally fights alone, this stat barely matters to him. In his upgraded form, World's Reincarnater, he maintains the same stats (save for support, which goes from nonexistent to below-average), but gets much stronger extra attacks.

Ardin
A hotblooded man who seems to love his voice, he is a member of the 7th General and his title is Aloof Soldier -7th General-. He may be strong but he is quite dumb. He proclaims to be Pasta's husband and has a Lolita Complex, but Pasta doesn't really care for him.

Voice by Sayaka Aoki
Another member of the 7th General. Her title is Marshall Kitten -7th General-.She is a catgirl (nekomimi) who is even shorter than Sarie. As her title suggests, she commands a group of cat-looking Mazoku. Uses “nyan” at the end of sentences.

She uses the lightning element and is similar to Misa, having incredibly fast attack speed, but a terrible charge speed. Her power is actually slightly stronger than Misa's, but average overall, and her support is also the same as Misa's.

Odylock
A giant ox demon. He is Sarie’s boss. A glutton who loves beef bowl. He fights with the Crusaders about the proper way to eat a beef bowl, but then becomes friendly afterward. His title is Gourmet Fighter -7th General-.

Zortia
A mysterious person who disguise herself as a teacher. Her title is Missing Feather -7th General-. Like Meilot, she is a powerful foe who also can copy the EX of Synn's fellow Student Council Members.

References

Twinkle Crusaders